Anthidium is a genus of bees often called carder or potter bees, who use conifer resin, plant hairs, mud, or a mix of them to build nests. They are in the family Megachilidae which is cosmopolitan in distribution and made up of species that are mostly solitary bees with pollen-carrying scopa that are only located on the ventral surface of the abdomen. Other bee families have the pollen-carrying structures on the hind legs. Typically species of Anthidium feed their brood on pollen and nectar from plants. Anthidium florentinum is distinguished from most of its relatives by yellow or brick-red thoracic bands. They fly all summer and make the nests in holes in the ground, walls or trees, with hairs plucked from plants.

Most Anthidium species are leaf-cutting bees who use conifer resin, plant hairs, earth, or a combination of these as material for the nest walls. Their abdominal bands are usually interrupted in the middle. There is no lobe (arolium) between their claws. Anthidium manicatum is commonly known as the wool carder bee which uses comblike mandibles to "comb" plant fibers into its brood cell walls. It has spread from Europe to North and South America. The males are much larger (ca. 18 mm) than the females (ca.12 mm) which is not uncommon among Megachilidae, but very rare among other bee families (e.g., the true honey bees, genus Apis). The males also have three "thorns" at their abdominal apex which they use as weapons when defending their territory.

Extant species

Anthidium abjunctum
Anthidium afghanistanicum
Anthidium akermani
Anthidium albitarse
Anthidium alsinai
Anthidium alticola
Anthidium amabile
Anthidium amurense
Anthidium andinum
Anthidium anguliventre
Anthidium anurospilum
Anthidium ardens
Anthidium armatum
Anthidium atricaudum
Anthidium atripes
Anthidium auritum
Anthidium aymara
Anthidium aztecum
Anthidium banningense
Anthidium basale
Anthidium bechualandicum
Anthidium berbericum
Anthidium bifidum
Anthidium bischoffi
Anthidium brevithorace
Anthidium callosum
Anthidium caspicum
Anthidium chilense
Anthidium christianseni
Anthidium chubuti
Anthidium cingulatum
Anthidium clypeodentatum
Anthidium cochimi
Anthidium cockerelli
Anthidium collectum
Anthidium colliguayanum
Anthidium comatum
Anthidium conciliatum
Anthidium cordiforme
Anthidium cuzcoense
Anthidium dalmaticum
Anthidium dammersi
Anthidium danieli
Anthidium decaspilum
Anthidium deceptum
Anthidium diadema
Anthidium echinatum
Anthidium edwardsii
Anthidium edwini
Anthidium emarginatum
Anthidium eremicum
Anthidium espinosai
Anthidium falsificum
Anthidium flavorufum
Anthidium flavotarsum
Anthidium florentinum
Anthidium formosum
Anthidium friesei
Anthidium fulviventre
Anthidium funereum
Anthidium furcatum
Anthidium garleppi
Anthidium gayi
Anthidium gratum
Anthidium gussakovskiji
Anthidium hallinani
Anthidium helianthinum
Anthidium himalayense
Anthidium igori
Anthidium illustre
Anthidium incertum
Anthidium isabelae
Anthidium jocosum
Anthidium kashgarense
Anthidium kashmirense
Anthidium klapperichi
Anthidium kvakicum
Anthidium laeve
Anthidium larocai
Anthidium latum
Anthidium loboguerrero
Anthidium longstaffi
Anthidium loti
Anthidium luctuosum
Anthidium luizae
Anthidium maculifrons
Anthidium maculosum
Anthidium manicatum
Anthidium masunariae
Anthidium montanum
Anthidium montivagum
Anthidium mormonum
Anthidium nigerrimum
Anthidium nigroventrale
Anthidium niveocinctum
Anthidium nursei
Anthidium oblongatum
Anthidium opacum
Anthidium ordinatum
Anthidium paitense
Anthidium pallidiclypeum
Anthidium palliventre
Anthidium palmarum
Anthidium paroselae
Anthidium perplexum
Anthidium penai
Anthidium peruvianum
Anthidium philorum
Anthidium placitum
Anthidium politum
Anthidium pontis
Anthidium porterae
Anthidium psoraleae
Anthidium pulchellum
Anthidium pullatum
Anthidium punctatum
Anthidium quetzalcoatli
Anthidium rafaeli
Anthidium rodecki
Anthidium rodriguezi
Anthidium rotundoscutellare
Anthidium rotundum
Anthidium rozeni
Anthidium rubricans
Anthidium rubripes
Anthidium rubrozonatum
Anthidium rufitarse
Anthidium sanguinicaudum
Anthidium semicirculare
Anthidium senile
Anthidium septemspinosum
Anthidium sertanicola
Anthidium severini
Anthidium sichuanense
Anthidium sikkimense
Anthidium sinuatellum
Anthidium soikai
Anthidium soni
Anthidium sonorense
Anthidium spiniventre
Anthidium striatum
Anthidium sublustre
Anthidium sudanicum
Anthidium syriacum
Anthidium taeniatum
Anthidium tarsoi
Anthidium taschenbergi
Anthidium tenuiflorae
Anthidium tergomarginatum
Anthidium ternarium
Anthidium tesselatum
Anthidium thomsoni
Anthidium toro
Anthidium undulatiforme
Anthidium undulatum
Anthidium unicum
Anthidium utahense
Anthidium venustum
Anthidium vigintiduopunctatum
Anthidium vigintipunctatum
Anthidium weyrauchi
Anthidium wuestneii
Anthidium zadaense

Fossil species
Four species have been described from the fossil record. The oldest species date from the Priabonian to Rupelian deposits of the Florissant Formation, Colorado.
†Anthidium basalticum Zhang, 1989
†Anthidium exhumatum Cockerell, 1906
†Anthidium mortuum (Meunier, 1920)
†Anthidium scudderi Cockerell, 1906

Notes

References 
 Chinery, Michael - Insects of Britain and Western Europe. Domino Guides, A & C Black, London, 1986

External links 

 Anthidium Identification Guide
 List of Species
 Worldwide Species Map

 
Bee genera